Frank Schuster may refer to:
 Frank Schuster (footballer)
 Frank Schuster (music patron)
 Frank R. Schuster, American Roman Catholic priest